The 2006 FEI World Equestrian Games were held in Aachen, Germany from August 20 to September 3, 2006. They were the 5th edition of the games which are held every four years and run by the FEI. It was held in the Soers, a district of Aachen. The main stadium of this event was the Hauptstadion.

Host selection
On September 18, 2002 in Jerez de la Frontera, Spain, the FEI awarded the 2006 Games to Aachen. The only other host city applicant was Lexington, Kentucky, United States (which was later awarded the following edition of the Games in 2010).

Events
16 events in 7 disciplines were held in Aachen.

Participating nations

59 National Equestrian Federations sent athletes to the Aachen games.

Medal summary

Medalists

Medal count

Broadcasting rights
The television broadcasting rights to the 2006 Games were held by the following networks:

 CBC Country Canada
 Eurosport
 Equidia
 ARD, WDR, ZDF
 RAI
 NOS
 SF, TSI, TSR
 SVT
 Dubai TV
 BBC
 HorseTV

See also
Equestrian at the 2008 Summer Olympics

References

External links
Official website

 
Equestrian
Sport in Aachen
FEI World Equestrian Games
International sports competitions hosted by Germany
Equestrian sports competitions in Germany
2006 in equestrian
21st century in North Rhine-Westphalia
August 2006 sports events in Europe
September 2006 sports events in Europe
Horse driving competition